Francesco Colelli (1734 - 1820) was an Italian painter, active in Calabria.

Early life
He was born in Nicastro, now part of Lamezia Terme in Calabria.

Career
He painted in a provincial, late-Baroque style which would have been prevalent a century before. He often painted religious frescoes in churches, including a Deposition from the Cross for the church of the Veterana in Cosenza, stolen in 1960. He also painted a Last Supper (1762), for the Cathedral of Nicastro.

References

1734 births
1820 deaths
People from Lamezia Terme
18th-century Italian painters
Italian male painters
19th-century Italian painters
19th-century Italian male artists
18th-century Italian male artists